The Sabah bow-fingered gecko (Cyrtodactylus ingeri), also known commonly as Inger's bow-fingered gecko,  is a species of lizard in the family Gekkonidae.  The species is endemic to Sabah in Malaysia.

Etymology
The specific name, ingeri, is in honor of American herpetologist Robert F. Inger.

Habitat

Description

Reproduction
C. ingeri is oviparous. Clutch size is two eggs. Each egg measures 12 mm x 9 mm (.47 in x .35 in).

References

Further reading
Hikida, Tsutomu (1990). "Bornean gekkonid lizards of the genus Cyrtodactylus (Lacertilia: Gekkonidae) with descriptions of three new species". Japanese Journal of Herpetology 13 (3): 91-107. (Cyrtodactylus ingeri, new species). 
Rösler, Herbert (2000). "Kommentierte Liste der rezent, subrezent und fossil bekannten Geckotaxa (Reptilia: Gekkonomorpha)". Gekkota 2: 28–153. (Cyrtodactylus ingeri, p. 66). (in German).
Tan, Fiu Lian (1993). Checklist of the Lizards of Sabah, Borneo. Kota Kinabalu, Malaysia: Natural History Publications. 18 pp. (Gonydactylus ingeri, new combination).

Cyrtodactylus
Reptiles described in 1990
Taxa named by Tsutomu Hikida
Endemic fauna of Borneo
Reptiles of Borneo